Fassifern railway station is located on the Main Northern line in New South Wales, Australia. It serves the City of Lake Macquarie suburb of Fassifern, opening in 1888.

The station has three platforms, although only two are in use, the third being the former branch-line platform for the Toronto line that closed in 1990. North of the line is a balloon loop for the Newstan Colliery that is served by Southern Shorthaul Railroad hauled trains.

In 1984, a footbridge was installed as part of the electrification of the line. It was replaced in 1994 when lifts were added.

Platforms & services
Fassifern has two operational side platforms and one closed side platform. It is serviced by NSW TrainLink Central Coast & Newcastle Line services travelling from Sydney Central to Newcastle.

It is also serviced by NSW TrainLink Xplorer and XPT long-distance services from Sydney to Armidale, Moree, Grafton, Casino and Brisbane.

Transport links
Hunter Valley Buses operate three routes via Fassifern station:
270: Newcastle University to Toronto West
271: Stockland Glendale to Toronto
273: Fassifern to Toronto via Blackalls Park

References

External links

Fassifern station details Transport for New South Wales

Easy Access railway stations in New South Wales
Railway stations in the Hunter Region
Railway stations in Australia opened in 1888
Regional railway stations in New South Wales
Main North railway line, New South Wales
City of Lake Macquarie